System Information may refer to:

 System Information (Mac)
 System Information (Windows)

See also
 System profiler